The 2009 Teen Choice Awards ceremony was held on August 9, 2009, at the Gibson Amphitheatre, Universal City, California. The event was hosted by the Jonas Brothers, Nick, Kevin and Joe, who also performed. Twilight took home most awards with the total of 10 wins out of 11 nominations, including Robert Pattinson winning Choice Male Hottie. Miley Cyrus presented Britney Spears with the Ultimate Choice Award.

Performers
 Jonas Brothers – "Much Better" / "World War III"
 Sean Kingston – "Fire Burning"
 The Black Eyed Peas – "I Gotta Feeling"
 Miley Cyrus – "Party in the U.S.A."

Presenters
 George Lopez • Presented Choice Drama TV Actor and Choice Drama TV Actress
 Jennette McCurdy, Nathan Kress, Jerry Trainor and Miranda Cosgrove • Presented Choice Twit
 Jordin Sparks • Presented Dare the Jonas Brothers
 Corbin Bleu and Ashley Tisdale • Presented Choice Comedy Movie Actor
 Lea Michele, Cory Monteith, Jenna Ushkowitz, Chris Colfer, Amber Riley, and Kevin McHale • Introduced Sean Kingston
 Emma Roberts and Hayden Panettiere • Presented Choice Breakout Movie Actor and Choice Breakout Movie Actress
 Keke Palmer and Emily Osment • Presented Choice Breakout TV Actor and Other Winners
 Kristen Bell and Ed Westwick • Presented Choice Summer Movie: Drama
 Shailene Woodley and Daren Kagasoff • Introduced Miley Cyrus
 Zach Gilford and Alexis Bledel • Presented Choice Summer TV Star: Female
 Dane Cook • Presented Choice Male Hottie and Choice Female Hottie
 Vanessa Hudgens, Gaelan Connell, and Aly Michalka • Introduced The Black Eyed Peas
 Marlon Wayans and Jordana Brewster • Presented Choice Action Movie Actor
 Miley Cyrus • Presented Ultimate Choice
 Jennifer Morrison and Honor Society • Presented Choice "Fab-u-lous"
 Josh Duhamel • Introduced the cast of "Twilight"
 Kim Kardashian and Shawn Johnson • Presented awards to the Jonas Brothers

Winners and nominees
Winners are listed first and highlighted in bold text.

Movies

Television

Music

Miscellaneous

References

2009
2009 awards in the United States
2009 in American music
2009 in California
2009 in Los Angeles